Schmehl Peak is a rock peak (750 m) at the north end of the ridge overlooking the junction of the Walsh Glacier with the Tomilin Glacier, in the Wilson Hills. Mapped by United States Geological Survey (USGS) from surveys and U.S. Navy air photos, 1960–63. Named by Advisory Committee on Antarctic Names (US-ACAN) for Lieutenant (j.g.) Peter W. Schmehl, U.S. Navy Reserve, Navigator in LC-130F Hercules aircraft during Operation Deep Freeze 1968.

Mountains of Oates Land